Robert Carlisle (died 1433), of Carlisle, Cumberland, was an English politician.

He was a Member (MP) of the Parliament of England for Carlisle in 1410, May 1413, November 1414, 1417, 1419, May 1421 and 1422.

References

14th-century births
1433 deaths
Politicians from Carlisle, Cumbria
English MPs 1410
English MPs May 1413
English MPs November 1414
English MPs 1417
English MPs 1419
English MPs May 1421
English MPs 1422